Mojo Priest is the second album by action film star Steven Seagal, following Songs from the Crystal Cave. The album was released in April 2006 by Seagal's own Steamroller Productions company. In a move not seen with Songs from the Crystal Cave, Seagal embarked on an extensive U.S. and international tour in support of the album.

The first single "Alligator Ass" premiered on Los Angeles radio station KYSR on the "Jamie, Jack, and Stench" show.

Reviews and ratings

Allmusic panned the album stating, "all of this music takes itself so seriously that it borders on delusional excess...Seagal's guitar playing, despite showcasing his Les Paul on the cover, leaves plenty to be desired. It rarely rises above bar band pedigree, and most of the time, isn't that good."

Track listing
"Somewhere in Between" - 4:17
"Love Doctor" - 3:40
"Dark Angel" - 3:57
"Gunfire In A Juke Joint" - 3:45
"My Time Is Numbered" - 4:19
"Alligator Ass" - 4:03
"BBQ" (with Teena Marie) - 3:26
"Hoochie Koochie Man" - 4:25
"Talk to My Ass" - 3:51
"Dust My Broom" (with Louisiana Red) - 4:38
"Slow Boat to China" - 8:43
"She Dat Pretty" - 3:44
"Red Rooster" - 3:29
"Shake" (with Bo Diddley)  - 3:32
"Untitled" (bonus track) - 0:36
"Untitled" (bonus track) - 0:45
"Untitled"  (bonus track) - 0:12

References

Steven Seagal albums
2006 albums